Insaan Bana Shaitan is a Hindi horror film of Bollywood directed by Mohan Bhakri and produced by Dalwinder Sohal. This film was released on 18 August 1992.

Plot
A young couple Raja and Rita are driving through a dense forest. They stop to take rest in an alienated bungalow without knowing that it is haunted. They are extremely tired and fall asleep as soon as they hit the bed. As soon as the clock strikes 12, the ghost comes out of its hiding at midnight at 0000 hours sharp and brutally murders them both in their sleep.

Cast
 Deepak Parashar
 Anil Dhawan
 Jagdeep
 Tej Sapru
 Bharat Kapoor
 Shiva Rindani
 Neelam Mehra
 aparajita
 Huma Khan
 Upasana Singh
 Mohini

References

1992 films
1990s Hindi-language films
Indian horror films
1992 horror films
Hindi-language horror films